Eloise is the second studio album by Swedish "dansband" Arvingarna, released in 1993. From the album, Arvingarna scored two Svensktoppen hit songs, "Eloise" and "Angelina", both 1993. The album also charted at number seven on the Swedish Albums Chart.

Track listing
Eloise
En sommar med dig
Vad hon inte vet
Sea of Love
Angelina
Det e bara jag
...och hon sa
Wasted Days and Wasted Nights
Samma ensamma jag
Då blir det rock'n roll
Himlen måste gråta
Mayday SOS
Kom till mig
Min Amazon

Charts

References

External links 

 

1993 albums
Arvingarna albums